( ) is the name of the former estate of Alexander Graham Bell, in Victoria County, Nova Scotia.

Alexander Graham Bell 

Wealthy from his successful invention and marketing of the telephone, inventor Alexander Graham Bell and his wife, Mabel, undertook a cruising vacation in 1885 along the coast of eastern North America with their intended destination being Newfoundland to view a mining operation that Mabel's father, Gardiner Greene Hubbard, had invested in. Along the way, the accidental grounding of their passenger boat made them serendipitously discover Cape Breton's Bras d'Or Lake, and they were enthralled by their surroundings.

Its landscape, climate, and Scottish traditions and culture were reminiscent of his birthplace in Edinburgh, Scotland.

Bell constructed a laboratory and boatyard on this property, conducting experiments in powered flight and hydrofoil technology, among many other things.

The Bells were both buried atop  mountain, on the estate, overlooking Bras d'Or Lake. The  estate owned by the Bells is on the peninsula at the end of  Road. It is now owned by their many descendants, is not open to the public, and is not visible from  Road. The second and larger home,  Hall (known locally as "The Point") was built in 1893. Both are visible from Baddeck, across Baddeck Bay. More information and pictures of the estate can be found by visiting the Alexander Graham Bell National Historic Site, a national park system unit and museum managed by Parks Canada, which contains many objects that were donated to the nation by Bell's descendants. The museum was designated a National Historic Site in 1952, while  Hall was named a National Historic Site in 2018.

National Geographic Society maps 
Alexander Graham Bell's father-in-law, Gardiner Greene Hubbard, was the first president of the National Geographic Society and Bell was its second president.  Bell's son-in-law Gilbert Hovey Grosvenor was president of the National Geographic Society for many years, and his grandson, Melville Bell Grosvenor, and great-grandson Gilbert Melville Grosvenor were editors of the National Geographic Magazine and also Presidents of the Society. Perhaps as a result, both  or Baddeck, the nearest town, are prominently displayed in National Geographic maps of the area, despite their relatively small size.

Gallery

See also 
 Alexander Graham Bell National Historic Site, Baddeck, Cape Breton, Nova Scotia, Canada
 Bell Boatyard, part of the  estate
 Bell Homestead National Historic Site, Brantford, Ontario, Canada
 Bell Memorial
 Dr. Mabel H. Grosvenor, last surviving grandchild and personal secretary of Alexander Graham Bell, and a steward of the  estate until her death in 2006
 Historic Buildings in Baddeck, Nova Scotia
 History of Baddeck
 Index of Alexander Graham Bell related articles
 Victoria County, Nova Scotia

References 

Alexander Graham Bell
Canadian Gaelic
General Service Areas in Nova Scotia
National Geographic Society